The Royal Society of Musicians of Great Britain is a charity in the United Kingdom that supports musicians. It is the oldest music-related charity in Great Britain, founded in 1738 as the Fund for Decay'd Musicians by a declaration of trust signed by 228 musicians, including Edward Purcell (eldest son of Henry Purcell), Thomas Arne, William Boyce, Richard Carter, Johann Christoph Pepusch, Hilda Wilson, Dr. John Worgan, and George Frideric Handel. It still operates a bank account at Drummonds Bank (now part of Royal Bank of Scotland) which was opened by its first secretary, Michael Christian Festing, in November 1738.

The fund received patronage from George III, and it was incorporated by royal charter in 1790. Funds were raised by holding charity concerts, musical dinners, and music festival. Liszt gave his first concert in England for the benefit of the society in 1824, aged 12. It also held performances by Mendelssohn, Moscheles, and Dvořák. Meyerbeer, Liszt, and Clara Schumann all became members. A Society of Female Musicians was formed in 1840, but merged with the royal society in 1866.

In the days before the welfare state, membership of the royal society guaranteed a degree of financial security to professional musicians. A second royal charter was granted in 1987, confirming its aims to support to all professional musicians (not just members) and their dependents who are in need through illness, disease or old age.

References

External links
Royal Society of Musicians's website

 
1738 establishments in Great Britain
Organizations established in 1738
Organisations based in the United Kingdom with royal patronage